Karel Goppold (15 December 1894 – 1956) was a Bohemian fencer. He competed in the individual épée event at the 1912 Summer Olympics. Goppold committed suicide in 1956.

References

External links
 

1894 births
1956 suicides
Czech male épée fencers
Olympic fencers of Bohemia
Fencers at the 1912 Summer Olympics
Sportspeople from Prague
1956 deaths
Suicides in Czechoslovakia